Grantham is a town in Lincolnshire in the United Kingdom.

Grantham may also refer to:

Places

Australia
Grantham Farm, New South Wales
Grantham, Queensland
Grantham County, Western Australia

Canada
Grantham, Alberta
Grantham, St. Catharines, a neighbourhood in Ontario

United States
Grantham, New Hampshire
Grantham, Pennsylvania

Other uses
Grantham (surname)
Grantham University, a proprietary school in the United States
Grantham Institute, a Global Institute on climate and global environmental change at Imperial College London
Grantham (UK Parliament constituency), UK former constituency
Grantham script, a Brahmic writing system